The Mowdish Range  is a mountain range in east-central British Columbia, Canada. It has an area of 303 km2 and is a subrange of the Cariboo Mountains which in turn form part of the Columbia Mountains. It is often called Mawdish Range with the local people and they have a tale about the misnaming which was made into a story. The name of the story is unknown and it has only been heard in old myths about the local people.

See also
List of mountain ranges

References

Cariboo Mountains